Roseanne is an American sitcom that was broadcast on ABC from October 18, 1988 to May 20, 1997. Starring Roseanne Barr, the show revolved around the Conners, an Illinois working-class family. The series reached #1 in the Nielsen ratings becoming the most watched television show in the United States from 1989 to 1990, and remained in the top four for six of its nine seasons, and in the top twenty for eight seasons.

In 1997, the episode "A Stash from the Past" was ranked #21 on TV Guides 100 Greatest Episodes of All-Time. In 2002, Roseanne was ranked #35 on TV Guide's 50 Greatest TV Shows of All Time.

American Comedy Awards

GLAAD Media Awards

Golden Globe Awards

Kids' Choice Awards

People's Choice Awards

Primetime Emmy Awards

Screen Actors Guild Awards

References

Awards
Lists of awards by television series